Majken Åberg (13 May 1918 – 14 February 1999) was a Swedish discus thrower. In 1948 she won the national championships and placed seventh at the London Olympics. Her father Arvid was an Olympic hammer thrower.

References

1918 births
1999 deaths
Swedish female discus throwers
Olympic athletes of Sweden
Athletes (track and field) at the 1948 Summer Olympics
Sportspeople from Norrköping